The Grunder Cabin and Outbuildings, on E. 1st, North in Paris, Idaho, dates from c.1880.  The collection was listed on the National Register of Historic Places in 1982.  The listing included three contributing buildings and one contributing structure.

A one-story  lean-to extends to the rear.

Its form is apparently from the Upland South.

References

National Register of Historic Places in Bear Lake County, Idaho
Buildings and structures completed in 1880